Bavaria Fluggesellschaft was a West German airline founded in 1957 and was merged with Germanair to become Bavaria Germanair in March 1977.

History

This airline was founded in 1957 as Bavaria Fluggesellschaft Schwabe & Co. In January 1958 the first aircraft, a Piper PA-23 Apache, was used for air taxi work. In 1959 the Twin Beech was added. Three Douglas DC-3s were acquired in 1960 and flown until disposal in 1967 and by this time the main business was carrying freight on behalf of Lufthansa.

With increased passenger traffic, a Handley Page Dart Herald was added in 1964 and by 1966 three were in service and about 800,000 passengers were carried that year including on seasonal holiday flights to the United Kingdom. In order to expand further, the BAC 1-11 jet airliner was added to the fleet in 1968 and a Handley Page Jetstream small turboprop aircraft was added to the regional schedules. The latter aircraft was involved in a fatal accident on 6 March 1970 (see below).

In 1974, a close cooperation was established with Germanair which culminated in the merger of both airlines to become Bavaria Germanair on 1 March 1977.

Fleet

Piper PA-23 Apache
Beechcraft Twin Beech
Douglas DC-3 (1960-1967)
Handley Page Dart Herald
BAC 1-11 (1968-1975)
Jetstream 31

Accidents and incidents
 On 6 March 1970, D-INAH, a Handley Page Jetstream owned by Bavaria Fluggesellschaft departed Munich-Riem Airport, West Germany, for Samedan Airport, Switzerland. The aircraft was written-off and all nine passengers and both crew were killed. It was discovered that part of the turbine wheel on the number one engine had been destroyed.

Bibliography
 Gradidge, Jennifer M, The DC-1, DC-2, DC-3 - The First Seventy Years, Air-Britain (Historians) Ltd, 2006,

References

Defunct airlines of Germany
Airlines established in 1957
Airlines disestablished in 1977
1957 establishments in West Germany
1977 disestablishments in West Germany
1977 mergers and acquisitions
German companies established in 1957